Joseph William Jee (1883 – after 1919) was an English professional footballer who played as an outside left in the Football League for Bolton Wanderers and Huddersfield Town and in the Southern League for Brighton & Hove Albion.

Notes

References

1883 births
Year of death missing
People from Chorlton-cum-Hardy
Sportspeople from Lancashire
English footballers
Association football outside forwards
Bolton Wanderers F.C. players
Brighton & Hove Albion F.C. players
Huddersfield Town A.F.C. players
Nelson F.C. players
English Football League players
Southern Football League players
Midland Football League players